Whisky Galore! is a 2016 British film, a remake of the 1949 Ealing Comedy of the same name, itself based on the novel by Compton Mackenzie. It was directed by Gillies MacKinnon and stars Gregor Fisher, Eddie Izzard, Sean Biggerstaff and Naomi Battrick. The film premiered at the 2016 Edinburgh Film Festival and went on general release in Scotland from 5 May 2017 and the rest of the UK, Ireland and the US from 19 May 2017. The principal film location was Portsoy, Aberdeenshire, Scotland.

Plot
Set in the Second World War when whisky rationing is in effect, Scottish islanders on the fictional Isle of Todday try to plunder cases of whisky from a ship that is stranded on rocks just offshore. The SS Cabinet Minister was carrying 50,000 cases of Scotch whisky to the United States when she ran aground, affording the islanders the opportunity to get their hands on the "water of life". There are problems, though; the local minister (a strict Sabbatarian who will not allow work to take place on a Sunday); Captain Waggett, the Home Guard officer who wants to stop any looting; and Farquharson the customs officer who also searches for the whisky in the islanders' homes afterwards.

Cast
 Gregor Fisher – Joseph Macroon
 Eddie Izzard – Captain Waggett
 Sean Biggerstaff – Sergeant Donald Odd
 Naomi Battrick – Peggy Macroon
 James Cosmo – Macalister the Minister
 Ellie Kendrick – Catriona Macroon
 Kevin Guthrie – George Campbell

Production
The production spent ten years in development hell. Producer Iain Maclean had initiated the project in 2004 with writer Bill Bryden attached and producers Stephen Evans, Maggie Montieth and Ed Crozier. He raised £400,000 through private investment to finance the development of the film through the company, Whisky Galore Development Ltd. After firing Bill Bryden, Peter McDougall was brought on board and wrote a script for a planned filming in the summer of 2006. The film never commenced production. Between 2006 and 2010, Stephen Evans and Ed Crozier left the project. In 2012, Iain Maclean, disheartened by the lack of production finance, had to let Whisky Galore Development slip into administration. In 2014 he decided to rekindle the project when he met Irish farmer and businessman Peter Drayne, who agreed to finance the film completely and resurrected the project, as long as the project was started from scratch. It was finally green-lit in 2015 and principal photography commenced later in 2015 in Scotland. In the interim Peter McDougall wrote a second screenplay. According to director Gillies MacKinnon, the film is a modern interpretation, not a proper remake: "The style is contemporary, embracing drama, romance and comedy, with an array of colourful characters providing a platform for a wonderful cast."

Release
Whisky Galore! has gained theatrical distribution in UK and US by Arrow and was scheduled to be released in cinemas in the UK on 5 May 2017.

Critical reception
The film received mixed reviews, with a critics' score of 42% on Rotten Tomatoes.

Kate Muir, writing in The Times, gave the film four stars out of five. She praised the "zippy farce" and in particular, Eddie Izzard's portrayal of Captain Waggett played "with psychotic, obsessive joy and a nod to Dad's Army's Captain Mainwaring". Muir also said that "fans of the original film may find little or no improvement in this remake, but for a new generation this Whisky Galore! will be a pleasure".

Toby Symonds, of The Film Blog also praised the film, describing it as "visually and aurally gorgeous".

However Helen O'Hara of Empire Magazine described the film as "Too restrained and polite to really grip the attention" and feeling "more like comfortable Sunday night TV than cinematic fare", while Jeannette Catsoulis of The New York Times wrote that "Beyond simple nostalgia...the appeal of this limp retread is difficult to discern".

References

External links
 

2016 films
Scottish films
Remakes of British films
Films scored by Patrick Doyle
Films set in the Outer Hebrides
Films directed by Gillies MacKinnon
Films about alcoholic drinks
English-language Scottish films